Hanne Liland (born August 7, 1969) is a retired female race walker from Norway.

Achievements

References

1969 births
Living people
Norwegian female racewalkers